The Lake Charles metropolitan statistical area is a metropolitan area in the Acadiana region of southwest Louisiana that covers two parishes—Calcasieu and Cameron. According to a 2019 census estimate, the MSA had a population of 210,409. It is also part of the larger Lake Charles-Jennings combined statistical area which had a population of 241,777 in 2019. The Lake Charles MSA also shares borders with the Beaumont–Port Arthur metropolitan area to the west. Metropolitan Lake Charles, the principal city, is commonly referred to as the Lake Area.

Parishes
Calcasieu
Cameron

Communities

Cities 

 DeQuincy
 Lake Charles (principal city)
 Sulphur (suburb)
 Westlake (suburb)

Towns 

 Iowa
 Vinton

Census-designated places 

 Cameron
 Carlyss (suburb)
 Hackberry
 Moss Bluff (suburb)
 Prien (suburb)

Unincorporated communities 

 Bell City
 Big Lake
 Creole
 Gillis
 Grand Chenier
 Grand Lake
 Hayes
 Holly Beach
 Johnson Bayou
 Mossville
 Starks

Demographics
According to the census of 2000, there were 193,568 people, 72,205 households, and 51,762 families residing within the MSA. By 2021, its population was 208,680 according to statistics from the American Community Survey. In 2021, the racial and ethnic makeup was an estimated 67% non-Hispanic white, 24% African American or Black, 1% Asian, 3% two or more races, and 4% Hispanic or Latino of any race. At the 2000 census, its racial makeup was 74.63% White, 22.94% African American, 0.31% Native American, 0.63% Asian, 0.03% Pacific Islander, 0.44% from other races, and 1.02% from two or more races. Hispanic or Latino of any race were 1.38% of the population.

In 2000, the median income for a household in the MSA was $34,802, and the median income for a family was $40,783. Males had a median income of $33,868 versus $20,252 for females. The per capita income for the MSA was $16,529. At the 2021 ACS census-estimates, its median household income increased to $58,736 with a per capita income of $30,000. Approximately 18.7% of the metropolitan population lived at or below the poverty line, with 24% of children under age 18 considered in poverty.

Transportation 
Interstate 10 intersects the metropolitan area with Houston, Texas and New Orleans. Interstate 210 loops around the city of Lake Charles, and U.S. Highway 90 runs parallel with Interstate 10; U.S. Highway 171 connects the area with Central and North Louisiana.

See also
Louisiana census statistical areas
List of cities, towns, and villages in Louisiana
List of census-designated places in Louisiana

References

 
Geography of Calcasieu Parish, Louisiana
Geography of Cameron Parish, Louisiana
Acadiana